Pterostylis parca commonly known as the Lithgow leafy greenhood is a plant in the orchid family Orchidaceae and is endemic to New South Wales. Non-flowering plants have a rosette of leaves on a short stalk. Flowering plants lack a rosette but have up to eight translucent pale green flowers on a flowering stem with three to six stem leaves.

Description
Pterostylis parca, is a terrestrial,  perennial, deciduous, herb with an underground tuber. The dorsal sepal and petals are joined to form a hood over the column with the dorsal sepal having a brown tip. Flowering occurs from August to October.

Taxonomy and naming
The Lithgow leafy greenhood was first formally described in 2006 by David Jones who gave it the name Bunochilus parcus and published the description in Australian Orchid Research from a specimen collected near Lithgow. In 2010, Gary Backhouse changed the name to Pterostylis parca. The specific epithet (parca) is a Latin word meaning "frugal", "scanty", "thrifty" or "penurious", referring to the small labellum of this species.

Distribution and habitat
Pterostylis parca grows in moist places in forest in the Lithgow and Bathurst areas.

References

parca
Orchids of New South Wales
Plants described in 2006